Rachael Finley (also known as "Steak") is an American fashion designer and influencer, known for making women's streetwear. She is LA-based.

Early life and education 
Rachael Finley grew up in South Florida. She became involved with music after graduating from High School. During her teenage life, she toured with various metal bands, sold merchandise, and lived on tour buses, which developed her taste in music.

Career 
She moved to Los Angeles to work for a record label and has since found her niche in fashion. She opened "The Shop" on Highland Ave, for her two clothing brands. She has written articles and posted fashionable snapshots which have helped her create a social media following. She owns a blog by the name, "Bad Advice", and has done podcasts by the same title.

She started to host "The Wonderland" TV show on MTV, in September 2016, with Lizzo and Myke Wright. She has experience of correspondent work with VICE and was in talks to be a contributor on a weekly podcast that discusses skate competitions and skate culture as a whole.

She was diagnosed with cancer in 2011. She and her ex-husband, Blake Anderson, own a clothing brand, named "Teenage". She also started her women’s clothing brand, known as "Hot Lava" in 2011.

She has also been the collaborator on the design of Lizzie Armanto’s Olympics Jumpsuit.

Personal life 
Rachael met Blake Anderson at a bar and eventually, married him in September 2012, and had their daughter, Mars Ilah Anderson, in February 2014. Due to differences, they remained separated for six months, before filing a divorce in 2017.

References 

Living people
1986 births
American fashion designers